Douglas Hamlet (died 13 February 1995) is a convicted murderer who was executed by Saint Vincent and the Grenadines (SVG). His execution, along with that of Franklin and David Thomas, are the most recent executions performed by SVG, and questions about the fairness of Hamlet's conviction have been raised.

Hamlet was convicted of murder and received a mandatory death sentence. The only evidence against Hamlet was the eyewitness testimony of a 14-year-old girl, who allegedly saw Hamlet committing the crime from a distance of 150 to 220 yards on a rainy day. He continued to maintain his innocence up to his execution. He was executed by hanging.

General references
Amnesty International, "State killing in the English speaking Caribbean: a legacy of colonial times", 2002-04-23
Heather Mills, "Life or death, long distance", The Independent, 1995-05-25

1995 deaths
20th-century executions by Saint Vincent and the Grenadines
Executed Saint Vincent and the Grenadines people
People executed by Saint Vincent and the Grenadines by hanging
People executed for murder
Saint Vincent and the Grenadines people convicted of murder
People convicted of murder by Saint Vincent and the Grenadines
Year of birth missing